Timothy Hodge (born 31 January 2001) is an Australian Paralympic swimmer. He represented Australia at the 2016 Rio Paralympics and the 2020 Tokyo Paralympics, where he won two silver and one bronze medals.

Personal
Hodge was born on 31 January 2001 in Blacktown, New South Wales. He lost his right foot when he was four due to lower-leg deficiency. In addition, he is missing two fingers on his right hand and his right arm is shorter than his left. He attended Patrician Brothers' College, Blacktown. , he is studying electrical engineering at university.

Career
Hodge swims in the S9 classification (SB8). Hodge competed at the 2015 IPC World Championships in Glasgow, where, at 14 years, he was the second youngest member of the Australian team. Hodge set his best individual time in 100m Backstroke (S9) finishing 8th.

At the 2016 Rio Paralympic Games, Hodge competed in five events. He placed fifth in the Men's 200m Individual Medley SM9 and sixth in the Men's 100m Backstroke S9. He didn't progress to the finals in Men's 100m Butterfly SB9, Men's 400m Freestyle S9 and Men's 100m Freestyle S9.

Hodge had succeeded in his aim to compete at the Paralympics, whether at Rio or Tokyo. He said, "If I can just push myself hard and get to the Paralympics, that’d be the greatest thing." He is a member of ACU Blacktown Swim Team in Sydney and is coached by Misha Payne.

Hodge won a silver medal in the 100m Breaststroke SB7 in the 2018 Commonwealth Games on the Gold Coast, Queensland, where he swam his personal best thus far.

At the 2019 Australian Swimming Championships, Hodge set a new world record to take gold in the Men’s 50m Backstroke Multi-Class race.

At the 2019 World Para Swimming Championships in London, Hodge won bronze medals in the Men's 100m Backstroke S9 and Men's 200m Individual Medley SM9.

At the 2020 Summer Paralympics in Tokyo, Hodge won a silver medal in the Men's 200 m individual medley SM9 with a time of 2:15.42. In the Men's 4x100m Medley 34 pts, he swam together with Timothy Disken, Ben Popham, and William Martin. His team won the silver medal in a time of 4:07.70, just over a second behind the winners, RPC, who set a new world record.  Hodge also won a bronze medal in the Men's 100 m backstroke S9 with a time of 1:02.16.

At the 2022 World Para Swimming Championships, Madeira, Hodge won three medals - gold in the Men's 200m Individual Medley SM9 and Mixed 4 × 100 m medley relay S14 and bronze in the Men's 100m Backstroke S9 

At the 2022 Commonwealth Games in Birmingham, Hodge won the gold medal in the Men's 100m Backstroke S9 and silver medal in the Men's 100 Breaststroke SB8.

Recognition
 2011 – Young Citizen of the Year in Blacktown, NSW, Australia.
 2018 – Sport NSW Young Athlete of the Year with a Disability 
 2019 – Sportsperson of the Year at the Blacktown City Sports Awards
 2021 – Sport NSW Young Athlete of the Year with a Disability supported by Variety, the Children's Charity NSW/ACT

References

External links
 
 
 

2001 births
Living people
Commonwealth Games medallists in swimming
Commonwealth Games gold medallists for Australia
Commonwealth Games silver medallists for Australia
Male Paralympic swimmers of Australia
People from Blacktown, New South Wales
S9-classified Paralympic swimmers
Swimmers at the 2016 Summer Paralympics
Swimmers at the 2020 Summer Paralympics
Swimmers at the 2018 Commonwealth Games
Swimmers at the 2022 Commonwealth Games
Medalists at the World Para Swimming Championships
Medalists at the 2020 Summer Paralympics
Paralympic silver medalists for Australia
Paralympic bronze medalists for Australia
Paralympic medalists in swimming
Australian male backstroke swimmers
Australian male medley swimmers
Australian male breaststroke swimmers
21st-century Australian people
Medallists at the 2018 Commonwealth Games
Medallists at the 2022 Commonwealth Games